The 2005 All-Ireland Senior Hurling Championship was the 119th staging of the All-Ireland Senior Hurling Championship, the Gaelic Athletic Association's premier inter-county hurling tournament, since its establishment in 1887. The draw for the provincial fixtures took place on 17 October 2004. The championship began on 15 May 2005 and ended on 11 September 2005.

Cork entered the championship as defending champions.

On 11 September 2005, Cork won the championship after a 1–21 to 1–16 defeat of Galway in the All-Ireland final at Croke Park. This was their 30th All-Ireland title overall and their second title in succession.

Galway's Ger Farragher was the championship's top scorer with 3-57.

New Format

On 17 April 2004, the Hurling Development Committee's proposal to restructure the entire championship system was endorsed by Congress. The new format resulted in a three-tier championship. In the top grade 12 teams would compete for the Liam MacCarthy Cup, with the first round losers and beaten semi-finalists from Leinster and Munster joining Antrim and Galway in a league section split into two groups. The group winners would re-enter the championship at the All-Ireland quarter-final stage, meeting the losing provincial finalists. The runners-up in each group would face the Leinster and Munster champions in the last eight. The new format provided two additional quarter-finals, a minimum of three games for each team and four for the vast majority. In the league section, matches would be played on a home and away basis. The bottom-placed teams in both groups would contest the relegation section with the eventual loser being relegated to the Christy Ring Cup.

Teams

Overview

Twelve teams participated in hurling's top tier in 2005. These were the same 12 teams who competed in Division 1 of the National Hurling League. The provincial championships in Leinster and Munster featured five teams each, while Antrim and Galway entered the championship at the group stage.

Personnel and general information

Provincial championships

Leinster Senior Hurling Championship

Bracket

Quarter-final

Semi-finals

Final

Munster Senior Hurling Championship

Quarter-finals

Semi-finals

Final

All-Ireland Senior Hurling Championship Qualifiers

Group A

Table

Results

Group B

Table

Results

Relegation Section

All-Ireland Senior Hurling Championship

Bracket

Quarter-finals

Semi-finals

Final

Championship statistics

Top scorers

Overall

In a single game

Miscellaneous

 The attendance of 81,136 at the All-Ireland final was the biggest since 1956 when 83,096 saw Wexford defeat Cork.

References

External links
Official GAA Website
RTÉ Sport Website
Hurling Statistics

All-Ireland Senior Hurling Championships
1